Pavlovsk is a rural locality (a selo) and the administrative center of Pavlovsky District of Altai Krai, Russia. Population:

Gallery

References

Rural localities in Pavlovsky District, Altai Krai